Aklie Edwards (born June 7, 1985) is a Trinidadian football player. He plays as a defender for TT Pro League side Defence Force.

Club career
Edwards began his professional career with TT Pro League side Defence Force. He is regarded as one of the top defenders in the league. Although he has played as a central defender, his primary position is left back.

Edwards play with the National Team has helped him receive interest from several Major League Soccer clubs.

International career
Edwards made his debut for the Trinidad and Tobago national football team on January 26, 2008 in a 2-2 draw with Puerto Rico. He scored his first senior international goal against Barbados on May 11, 2008 in a 3-0 victory for the Soca Warriors. He also started in Trinidad and Tobago's famous 2-1 victory over the United States in a 2010 World Cup qualifier.  In total Edwards has represented his country 22 times, scoring 1 goal.

National team career statistics

Goals for Senior National Team

References

fifa.com
http://caribbeanfootballdatabase.com/trinidadandtobago/players/aklieedwards.html
http://www.newsday.co.tt/sport/0,78771.html
https://web.archive.org/web/20110707233353/http://bigapplesoccer.com/teams/redbulls2.php?article_id=17560

1985 births
Living people
Association football defenders
Trinidad and Tobago footballers
Trinidad and Tobago international footballers
TT Pro League players
Defence Force F.C. players